Go Yoon (born Kim Jong-min; September 12, 1988) is a South Korean actor. He is perhaps known for his roles in the television series Criminal Minds (2017) and Sisyphus: The Myth (2021).

Filmography

Films

Television series

Web series

References

External links
 
 
 

1988 births
Living people
Male actors from Busan
Dongguk University alumni
South Korean male film actors
South Korean male television actors
21st-century South Korean male actors